Keltner may refer to:

People
 Chester W. Keltner, (1909–1998), grain analyst described what became known as the Keltner channel
 Dacher Keltner, professor of psychology
 Howard Keltner (1928–1998), comics creator and indexer
 Jim Keltner, (b. 1942), session drummer
 Ken Keltner, (1916–1991), Major League Baseball third baseman

Places
Keltner, Kentucky, United States
Keltner, Missouri, United States

Other uses
Keltner list, developed by baseball statistician Bill James